Diorygma is a genus of lichenized fungi in the family Graphidaceae. The genus was circumscribed by Franz Gerhard Eschweiler in 1824. Species of the genus are widely distributed in tropical and subtropical regions of the world.

Species
, Species Fungorum accepts 76 species of Diorygma.

Diorygma aeolum 
Diorygma africanum 
Diorygma agumbense  – India
Diorygma alagoense  – Brazil
Diorygma albocinerascens  – India
Diorygma albovirescens  – India
Diorygma angusticarpum  – Thailand
Diorygma antillarum 
Diorygma archeri  – Vietnam
Diorygma australasicum 
Diorygma basinigrum 
Diorygma cameroonense  – Africa
Diorygma chumphonense  – Thailand
Diorygma circumfusum 
Diorygma citri  – Thailand
Diorygma confluens 
Diorygma conprotocetraricum  – Thailand
Diorygma dandeliense  – India
Diorygma dealbatum  – India
Diorygma epiglaucum 
Diorygma erythrellum 
Diorygma excipuloconvergentum  – India
Diorygma extensum 
Diorygma fuscopruinosum  – Thailand
Diorygma fuscum  – China
Diorygma hieroglyphicellum  – Thailand
Diorygma hieroglyphicum 
Diorygma hololeucum 
Diorygma inaequale  – India
Diorygma incantatum  – Brazil
Diorygma inexpectatum  – Thailand
Diorygma intermedium 
Diorygma isabellinum 
Diorygma junghuhnii 
Diorygma karnatakense  – India
Diorygma kurnoolense  – India
Diorygma longilirellatum  – India
Diorygma longisporum  – Brazil
Diorygma macgregorii 
Diorygma manipurense  – India
Diorygma megaspermum  – India
Diorygma megasporum 
Diorygma megistosporum  – India
Diorygma microsporum 
Diorygma minisporum 
Diorygma monophorum 
Diorygma nigricans  – Peru
Diorygma occultum 
Diorygma panchganiense  – India
Diorygma pauciseptatum  – Brazil
Diorygma poitaei 
Diorygma pruinosum 
Diorygma radiatum 
Diorygma reniforme 
Diorygma roseopruinatum  – New Caledonia
Diorygma rufopruinosum 
Diorygma rufosporum  – India
Diorygma rupicola  – India
Diorygma salazinicum  – Thailand
Diorygma salvadoriense 
Diorygma saxicola  – India
Diorygma sipmanii 
Diorygma soozanum 
Diorygma sophianum  – Brazil
Diorygma spilotum 
Diorygma sticticum 
Diorygma streimannii  – Australia
Diorygma subalbatum  – India
Diorygma subpruinosum  – Thailand
Diorygma talisense 
Diorygma thailandicum  – Thailand
Diorygma tibellii 
Diorygma tocantinsense  – Brazil
Diorygma tuberculosum 
Diorygma upretii 
Diorygma verrucirimosum  – India
Diorygma wallamanensis  – Australia
Diorygma wilsonianum

References

Cited literature

 
Ostropales genera
Lichen genera
Taxa named by Franz Gerhard Eschweiler